Fastned is a Dutch company that owns and operates a network of over 200 EV charging stations in the Netherlands, Germany, the United Kingdom, Belgium, and Switzerland. A large majority of its stations are located at Dutch highway rest areas. Fastned was founded in 2012.

The company, a besloten vennootschap, is listed on Euronext Amsterdam and Nxchange. As of 2019, 11% of the company can be traded, while the remaining shares are owned by co-founders Bart Lubbers (51%) and Michiel Langezaal (30%) and by investment firm Breesaap (8%). Fastned's headquarters are located in Amsterdam, and its CEO is Langezaal.

History

Fundraising and first stations 
Fastned B.V. was founded in February 2012 by Michiel Langezaal and Bart Lubbers, the son of former Prime Minister Ruud Lubbers. The company received a permit that same year to build and operate charging stations at 201 rest areas in the Netherlands for a period of fifteen years. The first four locations opened in November 2013, the first of which was located at rest area Palmpol in Terschuur, Gelderland.

Building a single charging station required about €200,000. That money came from a number of funds owned by wealthy families, one of which was the Lubbers family fund called "Breesaap", that loaned €10 million. That loan was later converted to shares. Besides, the company started issuing stock certificates on NPEX, a stock exchange aimed at SMEs, in July 2014, raising €3.2 million in one and a half years.

The fiftieth charging station near Goes was opened by former Prime Minister Jan Peter Balkenende in January 2016. Due to the low proportion of electric vehicles in the Netherlands at the time, most charging stations were used between two and four times per day according to Fastned. In April, Fastned became the first company to be listed on Nxchange when it raised €3 million in five weeks through the issue of stock certificates. The company also issued bonds with a total face value of €22 million in 2016 and 2017.

Further expansion 
In 2018, the usage of Fastned's charging stations had slowly increased to an average of five to six customers daily. According to Langezaal, nearly one third of the stations were breaking even, having between 15 and 20 customers per day. The company's first foreign charging station was opened in June 2018 close to Limburg an der Lahn in Germany. Fastned also started constructing some smaller locations at Albert Heijn supermarkets and reached the mark of 100 charging stations in June 2019.

The company started being listed on Euronext Amsterdam on 21 June 2019, one week later than planned, making it possible for investors to convert their Nxchange stock certificates to Euronext certificates. The price rose from €11 to €53 on its first day, but returned to a price slightly above the initial price in the following days. Fastned had also planned an IPO that day in order to raise between €27 million and €30 million by issuing at most three million stock certificates. However, it was blown off the day before. Co-founder Bart Lubbers had left the management board one month earlier to become chairman of the supervisory board.

During the COVID-19 pandemic in 2020, Fastned experienced negative effects; its sales declined by 70% from February to March.

Network 

As of March 2021, Fastned's network consists of 134 EV charging stations, of which 105 are located in the Netherlands. The lion's share of Dutch charging stations are located at highway rest areas. Three are located at Albert Heijn supermarkets, and some more are situated in cities. The charging stations outside the Netherlands are in Germany (19), the United Kingdom (6), Belgium (2), and Switzerland (2). Four German locations are at hotels of Van der Valk, while the remaining are close to highways. The first British location was in Sunderland, and the company has won a tender to expand to London. In Switzerland, Fastned had won a tender to build twenty charging stations. Fastned's stations were used a total of 194,000 times during the last quarter of 2020 by 53,000 different customers. The company has plans to expand to France.

The earlier charging stations are characterized by two yellow arches with a curved roof, consisting of solar panels, in between. The company introduced a new station design in 2016 with a higher roof in order to accommodate electric trucks. Additionally, it is better suited to increases in the number of individual charging points at a station. The roof is still composed of solar panels, but they are see-through in the new design.

Finances 
Fastned's revenue had been close to zero during its initial years due to a low number of customers. In recent years, it has increased to €6.9 million (2019). The company has never turned a profit due to its continuing expansion.

Lawsuits 
Fastned has been involved in a number of lawsuits concerning permits to operate at rest areas.

Initial permit 
A number of gas station operators sued the Dutch government in 2013 after Fastned had received its permit to operate charging stations at rest areas. They claimed Fastned should not have been given the permit, as existent gas stations at rest areas had been given the exclusive right to sell fuel at those places. A judge upheld Fastned's permit in July 2013 stating that the agreement between the government and the gas stations only concerns fossil fuels.

Amenities at charging stations 
When Fastned wanted to add toilets and convenience stores at some of their locations, Rijkswaterstaat, the owner of the land of rest areas, did not grant the necessary permits. The government agency considered it inappropriate and unsafe to have some amenities twice at a single rest area. Fastned subsequently went to court in 2017 and won the case, as the judge found that Rijkswaterstaat provided insufficient support for its claim. Rijkswaterstaat appealed the decision, but lost again in 2019 at the Council of State, forcing the agency to grant a permit or to come up with better reasons for another denial.

Royal Dutch Shell 
After Royal Dutch Shell announced in 2017 it would place charging stations at some of its locations, Fastned filed a number of lawsuits trying to prevent this in December. Some of those charging stations were to be located at rest areas already having a Fastned location. Fastned did not manage to prevent the placement through the cases, in which it raised safety concerns and argued Shell could not sell electricity with its permit to sell fuel.

References

External links 

 Official website

Companies based in Amsterdam
Companies listed on Euronext Amsterdam
Dutch companies established in 2012
Electric vehicle infrastructure developers
Transport companies of the Netherlands
Charging stations